Agent 077: Mission Bloody Mary or Agente 077: Missione Bloody Mary is a 1965 Italian/Spanish/French international co-production spy adventure film and the first of the Secret Agent 077 film series directed by Sergio Grieco.

Plot
A group of criminals called the Black Lily murder and replace a US Air Force navigator near a base in the United Kingdom. The infiltrator crashes the plane in order to recover a new deadly nuclear bomb code named "Bloody Mary". The criminals sell the weapon to Red China. A CIA agent tracks down the weapon from France to Spain where it travels by a cargo ship to Athens.

Cast
 Ken Clark as Dick Malloy/Jack Clifton
 Helga Liné as Elsa Freeman
 Philippe Hersent as Lester
 Maryse Guy Mitsouko as Kuan
 Umberto Raho as Prof. Betz (credited as Umi Raho)
 Silvana Jachino as Juanita (credited as Susan Terry)
 Antonio Gradoli (credited as Anthony Gradwell)
 Andrea Scotti
 Brand Lyonell
 Peter Blades
 Peter Bach
 Franca Polesello as Malloy's/Clifton's girlfriend
 Pulla Coy
 Mirko Ellis
 Erika Blanc

References

External links 
 

1965 films
French spy films
Spanish spy films
1960s Italian-language films
1960s action adventure films
Films about nuclear war and weapons
1960s spy thriller films
Italian spy thriller films
Films scored by Ennio Morricone
Films directed by Sergio Grieco
Italian action adventure films
Films scored by Angelo Francesco Lavagnino
Films set on trains
Films shot in Paris
Films shot in Istanbul
Films set in Athens
Parody films based on James Bond films
1960s Italian films
1960s French films